Jackson Memorial High School is a four-year comprehensive public high school serving students in ninth through twelfth grades in Jackson Township, in Ocean County, New Jersey, United States, opened in 1963 as part of the Jackson School District. It is the sister high school of Jackson Liberty High School, which opened in late summer 2006.

As of the 2021–22 school year, the school had an enrollment of 1,568 students and 108.8 classroom teachers (on an FTE basis), for a student–teacher ratio of 14.4:1. There were 194 students (12.4% of enrollment) eligible for free lunch and 76 (4.8% of students) eligible for reduced-cost lunch.

History
Before the high school opened, students living in Jackson attended Lakewood High School as part of a sending/receiving relationship.

Jackson High School first opened in September 1963 with 700 students in grades 7-9, though other district school facilities were used on a temporary basis as the building that housed Jackson Junior-Senior High School wasn't completed and opened to students until the spring of 1964. The school was originally a single, one story building with three wings. Around 1970, a second story was added to one wing. In the 1980s, it was expanded to include the nearby middle school which became known as the Clayton building. The original high school building was known as the memorial building in the early 1990s; later it was renamed the Bernie Reider Hall, for a longtime wrestling coach and former principal. The Fine Arts building, added , connects the once separate Clayton building, previously a middle school, and the two-story Bernie Reider Hall.

Awards, recognition and rankings
The school was the 115th-ranked public high school in New Jersey out of 339 schools statewide in New Jersey Monthly magazine's September 2014 cover story on the state's "Top Public High Schools", using a new ranking methodology. The school had been ranked 188th in the state of 328 schools in 2012, after being ranked 181st in 2010 out of 322 schools listed. The magazine ranked the school 216th in the magazine's September 2008 issue, which surveyed 316 schools across the state.  Schooldigger.com ranked the school 166th out of 381 public high schools statewide in its 2011 rankings (a decrease of 22 positions from the 2010 ranking) which were based on the combined percentage of students classified as proficient or above proficient on the mathematics (80.8%) and language arts literacy (94.1%) components of the High School Proficiency Assessment (HSPA).

Athletics
The Jackson Memorial High School Jaguars compete in Division A South of the Shore Conference, an athletic conference comprised of public and private high schools in Monmouth and Ocean counties along the Jersey Shore. The league operates under the jurisdiction of the New Jersey State Interscholastic Athletic Association (NJSIAA). With 1,186 students in grades 10-12, the school was classified by the NJSIAA for the 2019–20 school year as Group IV for most athletic competition purposes, which included schools with an enrollment of 1,060 to 5,049 students in that grade range. The school was classified by the NJSIAA as Group IV South for football for 2018–2020.

The school participates in a joint ice hockey team with Point Pleasant Borough High School in which Jackson Liberty High School is the host school / lead agency. The co-op program operates under agreements scheduled to expire at the end of the 2023–24 school year.

Jackson is a powerhouse in many sports and its key rivals are Southern Regional, Toms River South, Toms River North, Toms River East, Brick Memorial and Brick Township.

Baseball
Team championships
Ocean County Tournament champions - 1972, 2012, 2015
Shore Conference Tournament champions - 1984, 2012
South Jersey Group IV sectional champions - 2002, 2010, 2014
State champions - 1972 (in Group III, with a 2-1 win against runner-up Summit High School led by future MLB player Willie Wilson) and 2014 (in Group IV, with a 2-0 win vs. Roxbury High School)

Girls basketball
Team championships
Group IV state champions - 2012 (with a 50-47 win vs. North Hunterdon High School in the finals)

Boys bowling
Team championships
1975-1976 Overall state champions
2010-2011 South Jersey Group IV sectional champions
2010-2011 Group IV state champions
2011-2012 South Jersey Group IV sectional champions
2011-2012 Group IV state champions
2012-2013 South Jersey Group IV sectional champions
2012-2013 Group IV state champions
Individual champions
Mike Ormsby - 2013 individual state champion
Donald Kane - 2013 South Jersey individual state sectional champion
Mike Ormsby - 2011 South Jersey individual state sectional champion
2022 Group III state champion

Girls bowling
Team championships
1975 Overall state champion
1978 Overall state champion
2015 Group IV state champion

Boys cross country
Team championships
State sectional champions - 2006
Meet of Champions winners - 2006
2006-2007 New Jersey state champions
Central Jersey Group IV Champions - 2006, 2007

Girls cross country
Team championships
Central Jersey Group IV Champions - 2004, 2005

Football
Team championships
South Jersey Group IV sectional champions - 2000 (finishing 12-0 after a 14-7 overtime win against Shawnee High School in overtime) and 2001 (with a 12-0 record after a 24-0 win vs. Cherokee High School in the finals)
Central Jersey Group IV sectional champions - 2005 (finishing 12-0 after a 30-28 win vs. Brick Memorial High School on a last-second touchdown), 2014, and 2015

Ice hockey
Team championships
Handchen Cup - 2017

Indoor relay
Team championships
Girls champion Group IV - 2003, 2005; Group III - 2016

Boys soccer
Team championships
South Jersey Group IV sectional champions - 1990
New Jersey Group IV state champions - 1990 (defeating Kearny High School by a score of 4-0, to finish the season 22-1)

Boys spring track
Team championships
2009-2010 Ocean County champions

Girls spring track
Team championships
2006 Group IV state champion

Boys winter track
Team championships
2010 Group III state champions
2010 Central Jersey Group III sectional champions

Girls winter track
Team championships
Group IV state championship - 2005, 2006

Wrestling
Team championships
Central Jersey Group IV state sectional champions - 2004-2007, 2010, 2011, 2015-2017, 2019.
Group IV state champion - 2007, 2010, 2011

Marching band
The school's marching band won the US Bands State and National Championships in 2017, and traveled down to Orlando, Florida to march down Main Street in Disney's Magic Kingdom in the spring of 2017.  Their current show is entitled "Heroes".

The Jackson Memorial Jaguar Band has performed at many events including:

2013 New Year's Day (Tournament of Roses Parade) in Pasadena 
Presidential Inaugural Parade for George W. Bush, 
Cherry Blossom Parade: Washington DC,
Philadelphia Thanksgiving Day Parade,
NYC St. Patrick's Day Parade, 
D-Day Invasion Ceremony: Normandy-France,
Hula Bowl Halftime and pregame: Waikiki-Hawaii,
4 Ticker Tape parades for the New York Yankees,
2 Ticker Tape parades for the New York Giants (NFL),
Opening Night performance for "42nd Street": Ford Theater-NYC,
Opening Night performance for "The Music Man" NYC,
Performance at the Funeral of Levon Helm: Woodstock-NY,
Conan O'Brien: 10th Anniversary Special,
Radio City Music Hall: Performance for Dolly Parton

The Jackson Jaguar Marching Band won the USBands Group 6A National Championship Title in 2013 with a score of 96.3, their first national championship. They won first place in the percussion and music category then second in colorguard, general effect, and marching.

Administration
Kevin DiEugenio is the principal of Jackson Memorial High School. His core administration team includes three assistant principals.

Notable alumni

 Scotty Cranmer (born 1987), professional BMX rider who has won nine X Games medals (2015).
 Joey DeZart (born 1998), professional soccer player who currently plays as a midfielder for Orlando City in Major League Soccer.
 Erin Gleason (born 1977), short track speed skater who competed in three events at the 1998 Winter Olympics.
 Anthony Stolarz (born 1994, class of 2012), professional ice hockey goaltender for the Edmonton Oilers.
 Tom Tarver, quarterback who played for the Rutgers University Scarlet Knights, after leading Jackson Memorial to a 32-7 record during his high school career.
 Matt Thaiss (born 1995, class of 2013), first round pick in the 2016 MLB Draft by the Los Angeles Angels.
 Zakk Wylde (born 1967), guitarist for Ozzy Osbourne and Black Label Society (1985).
 E. J. Nduka (born 1988), former WWE superstar.

References

Sources
Erbe, E. Robert (1999). Cranberries, Coops, and Courts: A History of Jackson Township.

External links 
Jackson Memorial High School
Jackson School District

School Data for the Jackson School District, National Center for Education Statistics
Day in the Life: Jackson Memorial High School from the Asbury Park Press
DigitalSports Jackson Memorial Homepage

1963 establishments in New Jersey
Educational institutions established in 1963
Jackson Township, New Jersey
Public high schools in Ocean County, New Jersey